Henry Kerner is an American lawyer who serves as the Special Counsel in the United States Office of Special Counsel.

Biography
Kerner received a bachelor's degree and a master's degree in history from the University of California, Los Angeles, before obtaining his J.D. at Harvard Law School in 1992.

He spent 18 years as a prosecutor in California before becoming staff director for U.S. Senator John McCain at the United States Senate Homeland Security Permanent Subcommittee on Investigations. In 2011, Kerner joined the United States House Committee on Oversight and Government Reform, working beneath Under Chairman Darrell Issa and Chairman Jason Chaffetz.

Kerner went on to become Assistant Vice President for Investigations at the small-government advocacy organization Cause of Action Institute. In June 2017, President Donald Trump nominated Kerner to become Special Counsel at the United States Office of Special Counsel. He was confirmed by the 115th Congress with final voting from the U.S. Senate in October 2017.

References

External links
 Biography at the U.S. Office of Special Counsel
 
 "Newly Installed Special Counsel Wants to Adjudicate Cases More Swiftly" Government Executive. Retrieved March 6, 2018

Living people
University of California, Los Angeles alumni
Harvard Law School alumni
21st-century American lawyers
Trump administration personnel
Year of birth missing (living people)
Place of birth missing (living people)